Kaveri Grameena Bank (Kannada:ಕಾವೇರಿ ಗ್ರಾಮೀಣ ಬ್ಯಾಂಕ್) was a Regional Rural Bank established under Regional Rural Banks' Act 1976, was a Scheduled Bank jointly owned by Government of India, State Bank of India(formerly by State Bank of Mysore) and Government of Karnataka (share capital contributed in the ratio of 50 :35:15 respectively), permitted to carry all kinds of banking business. The Bank was operating in 10 Districts of South Karnataka, having its Head Office at Mysore City with Nine Regional Offices at Mysuru, Mandya, Bengaluru, Tumakuru, Hassan, Chamarajanagar, Madikeri, Chikmagulur and Ramanagara.

The Bank was started as Cauvery Grameena bank and served Mysore, Hassan and Chamarajanagar districts. The bank was renamed as Kaveri Grameena Bank on 1 November 2012 (Sponsored by State Bank of Mysore) by Amalgamation of Cauvery Kalpatharu Grameena Bank, Chikmagalur Kodagu Grameena Bank and Vishvesvaraya Grameena Bank, Sponsored by State Bank of Mysore, Corporation Bank and Vijaya Bank respectively.

The Headquarters of Kaveri Grameena Bank was located at Vijayanagar Second Stage, Mysore, which is now converted as IT Centre of Karnataka Gramin Bank, post merger.

History

Year - event
2012 - The Bank was established as 'Kaveri Grameena Bank', on 1 November in South Karnataka (Headquartered at Mysuru).
2014 - Bank has recorded a growth rate of 36.52 per cent during 13–14.
2014 - Bank launches financial inclusion scheme.
2014 - Bank opens four branches in Mandya district.
2015 - The Kaveri Grameena Bank has enrolled over 48,000 subscribers for the PMSBY in Mysore.
2015 - Kaveri Grameena Bank has enrolled 1,01,104 subscribers to the insurance schemes underlining the popularity of the social security schemes in rural areas.
2015 - The Kaveri Grameena Bank plans to extend internet and mobile banking services to its customers.
2019 - The Kaveri Grameena bank amalgamated with Pragathi Krishna Gramin Bank to form Karnataka Gramin bank.

See also
Indian banking
List of banks in India
Pragathi Gramin Bank
Karnataka Gramin Bank

References

External links
 Official Website
 Internet Banking

Regional rural banks of India
Banks based in Karnataka
Companies based in Mysore
Banks established in 2012
Indian companies established in 2012
2012 establishments in Karnataka
Banks disestablished in 2019
Indian companies disestablished in 2019
2019 disestablishments in Karnataka